Payback 2 is a mobile online multiplayer action video game developed and published by Apex Designs Entertainment Ltd. It is the sequel to the original 2001 Payback game, and was first released on 4 October 2012 for iOS, became free to play in 2013, and was released for Android on 10 October 2014 under the title Payback 2 - The Battle Sandbox.

Gameplay 
Payback 2 has a single-player "story" mode consisting of multiple chapters, the usual objective of each chapter being for the player to complete missions in order to obtain enough money to complete the chapter, unlocking the next. The player receives a mission after answering a ringing payphone, where instructions from "the boss" are given via an accomplice. The mission instructions include various criminal acts such as assassination or robbery. The player may also obtain money from activities such as destroying vehicles and killing pedestrians. After committing crimes, the player has to avoid being arrested or killed by the police, SWAT or army.

Payback 2's "campaign" mode consists of multiple "episodes", each of which contains various kinds of solo or team events played against or with the AI characters. Some of these events include: "Brawl", the objective being kill the most opponents; "Gang Warfare", practically "Brawl" but with two teams; "Capture the Swag", a parody of the outdoor game Capture the Flag; "Conquest", where the player must claim parts of the map; "Kingpin", similar to "Conquest"; "Race", where the player races against the AI characters in various vehicles around various routes in the different maps; "Sprint", practically "Race", but the routes are shorter; and "Knockout", like "Race", but the player in last place is eliminated on an interval.

Payback 2's multiplayer mode lets players create and configure multiplayer versions of the event types mentioned above, that are hosted on one of the four proprietary game servers of choice. Once the first round finishes, the players can then vote between two randomly generated configurations for the next game. Private multiplayer matches are created in the same way, and the creator can share the four character long "shortcode", which is required to join, with whoever they want to play with. On completion of a public or private match, players earn an amount of "XP" depending on their result.

The music used in Payback 2's startup cutscene is Requiem Mass in D minor - Lacrimosa dies illa by Wolfgang Amadeus Mozart.

Development

The original Payback focused on single-player gameplay, however when developing Payback 2, James Daniels from Apex Designs decided to put more emphasis on multiplayer gameplay. In May 2015, Apex Designs released an update that dramatically improved the game's visuals. The original textures, which had been in use since the original Payback, were replaced with remastered versions, the lighting mechanics were also upgraded significantly too. In December 2016, the would title would receive another major update, adding a proper and more realistic rigidbody physics system, improved gravity, vehicle models, character models, driving physics and more.

Initial reception

Upon Payback 2's initial release, TouchArcade praised it for being a competent "Grand Theft Auto clone", but criticized its lack of a good story. Slide2Play would criticize the game, claiming that it "...still has issues with its basic design. Winning a race is literally as easy as pushing forward... it's hard to target the (other) bad guys in the game's on-foot shooting mission... Shooting is also made difficult by the fact that everybody on-screen is tiny and seems to blend in with the dull environments." Several journalists noted having issues connecting, or finding, people to play with online as well.

References 

2012 video games
Android (operating system) games
IOS games
Organized crime video games
Role-playing video games
Video games developed in the United Kingdom